Randall Alexander Scott Murray (born August 24, 1945) is a Canadian retired professional ice hockey player who played three games in the National Hockey League for the Toronto Maple Leafs during the 1969–70 season. The rest of his career, which lasted from 1966 to 1974, was spent in the minor leagues.

Career statistics

Regular season and playoffs

External links
 

1945 births
Living people
Calgary Buffaloes players
Canadian expatriate ice hockey players in the United States
Canadian ice hockey defencemen
Charlotte Checkers (EHL) players
Ice hockey people from Ontario
London Nationals players
Sportspeople from Chatham-Kent
Toronto Maple Leafs players
Tulsa Oilers (1964–1984) players